Today's Railways may refer to two railway magazines published by Platform 5 Publishing:

Today's Railways Europe, ISSN 1354-2753
Today's Railways UK, ISSN 1475-9713